Charles Calvin Pixley (August 8, 1923 – December 31, 2005) was the 34th Surgeon General of the United States Army, serving in that capacity from October 1, 1977 to September 20, 1981.

Early life 
Pixley was born in Grants Pass, Oregon. While studying at the University of Oregon, he enlisted in the United States Navy on June 6, 1942. Pixley completed his B.A. degree in 1943 and was accepted to medical school. Released from his Navy commitment, he enlisted in the Army on February 29, 1944. Pixley earned his M.D. degree from the University of Oregon Medical School in 1947 and later completed an M.S. degree in surgery at Baylor University. He received a commission as a first lieutenant in the United States Army Reserve on January 20, 1947 and was integrated into the Regular Army in that grade on September 4, 1948.

Residency 
He completed his residency in surgery at Robert Packer Hospital, Sayre, Pennsylvania, from November 1948 to September 1949 after which he completed a special course in orthopedic surgery at Columbia College of Physicians and Surgeons until November 1949 when he was promoted to Captain. He was then assigned to Brooke Army Medical Center for a one-year residency in general surgery as off 1 January 1950. In March 1950, he was ordered to the Ryukyus Command in Okinawa on a special 90-day temporary duty assignment to help relieve the shortage of medical officers in the Far East Command. In May the TDY was extended to 150 days. He returned to Brooke AMC in November 1950 and resumed his residency in surgery on 1 January 1951. He remained at Brooke for the next 3 years, first as senior resident in general surgery until 31 December 1952 and then as chief resident in general surgery until 31 December 1953.

Further training 
In February 1954, Pixley was transferred to Fort Benning, Georgia, and assigned to the U.S. Army Hospital. While at Fort Benning, he was promoted to Major in April 1954. He was then assigned to the Office of The Surgeon General from November 1954 until July 1958 when he moved to Fort Sam Houston, Texas, to attend the Officers' Advanced Course at the Medical Field Service School. Then he completed the U.S. Air Force School of Aviation Medicine and the Army Aviation Medical Orientation Course at the U.S. Army Aviation School, Fort Rucker, Alabama, before serving at year in Korea. He then attended the U.S. Army Command and General Staff College at Fort Leavenworth, Kansas, from July 1960 to July 1961. He was promoted to Lt. Colonel in May 1961. In July 1961, he was assigned to the U.S. Army Hospital, Fort Lee, Virginia, and remained there until July 1963 when he moved to the Office of The Surgeon General to become the chief of the Medical Corps Branch, Directorate of Personnel and Training. From August 1965 to July 1966, he attended the Air War College, Maxwell Air Force Base, Alabama,

Promotions 
From August 1965 to July 1966, he studied at the Air War College, Maxwell Air Force Base, Alabama, before going to Vietnam in July 1966 to command the 68th Medical Group for a year. He was promoted to Colonel in September 1966. He returned from Asia in June 1967 to become for three years the commanding officer of the Army Medical Training Center at Ft. Sam Houston, Texas. He left there in April 1970 for assignment to Ft. George G. Meade, Maryland where he served as First Army Surgeon. While there, he was promoted to brigadier general on 1 November 1972. He moved back to The Surgeon General's Office in February 1973 where he spent a month in its Supply and Operations Branch before becoming Director of Health Care Operations until August 1975. He next served as commanding general of William Beaumont Army Medical Center, El Paso, Texas where he was promoted to major general on 1 September 1976. General Pixley left El Paso in December for Ft. Sam Houston, Texas where he became the superintendent of the Army Academy of Health Sciences, serving there for a year prior to his appointment as the Surgeon General.

Awards and recognitions

Personal 
Pixley was married to Marian Vanderbrook. The couple had two daughters and six grandchildren. His wife died in 1978 while he was serving as the Army Surgeon General.

After his own death in 2005, Pixley was interred at Fort Sam Houston National Cemetery.

References

 Terrence Hawkins dd214 too.

1923 births
2005 deaths
People from Grants Pass, Oregon
University of Oregon alumni
Military personnel from Oregon
United States Navy sailors
Oregon Health & Science University alumni
Physicians from Oregon
United States Army personnel of the Vietnam War
Baylor College of Medicine alumni
20th-century surgeons
Recipients of the Legion of Merit
Surgeons General of the United States Army
Burials at Fort Sam Houston National Cemetery
Air War College alumni
United States Army Command and General Staff College alumni